Amaranthus hybridus, commonly called green amaranth, slim amaranth, smooth amaranth, smooth pigweed, or red amaranth, is a species of annual flowering plant. It is a weedy species found now over much of North America and introduced into Europe and Eurasia.

Description

Amaranthus hybridus grows from a short taproot and can be up to 2.5 m in height. It is a glabrous or glabrescent plant.

Distribution
Amaranthus hybridus was originally a pioneer plant in eastern North America. It has been reported to have been found in every state except Wyoming, Utah, and Alaska. It is also found in many provinces of Canada, and in parts of Mexico, the West Indies, Central America, and South America. It has been naturalized in many places of warmer climate. It grows in many different places, including disturbed habitats.

Taxonomy
It is extremely variable, and many other Amaranthus species are believed to be natural hybridizations or derive from A. hybridus.

As a weed
Although easily controlled and not particularly competitive, it is recognized as a harmful weed of North American crops.

Uses 
The seeds and cooked leaves are edible.

The plant was used for food and medicine by several Native American groups and in traditional African medicine.  It is among the species consumed as Quelite quintonilli in Mexican food markets.

References

External links
 Jepson Manual Treatment
 Various images of green amaranth
 Ethnobotany

hybridus
Edible plants
Flora of North America
Flora of South America
Plants used in traditional African medicine
Plants used in traditional Native American medicine
Plants described in 1753
Taxa named by Carl Linnaeus